ESO 280-SC06 (also known as ESO 280-6) is a globular cluster 69,800 light years from the Sun in the constellation of Ara. The cluster received this designation when it was catalogued by the European Southern Observatory (ESO) in Chile. Imagery and Hertzsprung-Russell diagrams show a sparsely populated globular cluster with a compact core.

References

Globular clusters
Ara (constellation)
ESO objects